The Fogtdal Photographers Awards (Danish: Fogtdals Fotografpriser) is the largest awards programme dedicated specifically to Danish photography. It was established in 2004 by Danish publisher Palle Fogtdal. The awards programme consists of an Honorary Award, rewarded with DKK 250,000, and five other awards, each rewarded with a travel grant of DKK 50,000. Every year the winners are presented in an exhibition at Fotografisk Center in Copenhagen.

Fogtdal Honorary Award laureates

Fogtdal Award laureates

2008
In 2008 the five winners were:
 Liv Carlé Mortensen
 Torben Eskerod
 Peter Funch
 Kajsa Gullberg/Fryd Frydendahl
 Camilla Holmgren

2009
In 2009 the five winners were:
 Mads Gamdrup
 Tove Kurtzweil
 Finn Larsen
 Trine Søndergaard / Nicolai Howalt
 Signe Vad

See also
 Photography in Denmark
 List of European art awards
 List of photography awards

References

External links
 Fotografisk Center

Photography in Denmark
Photography awards
Danish art awards
Awards established in 2004